Haslar Marina is located inside Portsmouth Harbour, on the south coast of England, just to the west of the entrance. It can be easily identified by the bright green lightvessel Mary Mouse II permanently moored to the outside of its breakwater. The lightship contains a small bar and restaurant, as well as one set of shower, toilet and laundry facilities. (Others are located elsewhere in the marina.) Visitors' berths are near the entrance by the lightship.

Haslar Marina, Portsmouth
Buildings and structures in Hampshire
Tourist attractions in Hampshire